Tejada is a municipality and town located in the province of Burgos, Castile and León, Spain.

References

Municipalities in the Province of Burgos